Nicolas Gédoyn (15 June 1677 – 10 August 1744) was a French clergyman, translator, pioneer educationalist and literary critic. He was the fifth member elected to occupy seat 3 of the Académie française in 1719, and the Académie des Inscriptions et Belles-Lettres in 1722

Gédoyn was born in Orléans.  Trained by the Jesuits from the age of 15, he was appointed professor of rhetoric in Blois, then canon at the Sainte-Chapelle and Abbey Beaugency.  Among his literary works are translations of Quintilian and Pausanias.  He died in Beaugency.

References

 
 

1667 births
1744 deaths
Clergy from Orléans
French translators
French educational theorists
French literary critics
Members of the Académie Française
Members of the Académie des Inscriptions et Belles-Lettres
French male writers
Writers from Orléans